Isaiah 15 is the fifteenth chapter of the Book of Isaiah in the Hebrew Bible or the Old Testament of the Christian Bible. This book contains the prophecies attributed to the prophet Isaiah, and is one of the Books of the Prophets. This chapter and the following chapter deal with the forthcoming history of Moab.

Text 
The original text was written in Hebrew language. This chapter is divided into 9 verses.

Textual witnesses
Some early manuscripts containing the text of this chapter in Hebrew are of the Masoretic Text tradition, which includes the Codex Cairensis (895), the Petersburg Codex of the Prophets (916), Aleppo Codex (10th century), Codex Leningradensis (1008).

Fragments containing parts of this chapter were found among the Dead Sea Scrolls (3rd century BCE or later):
 1QIsaa: complete
 1QIsab: extant verses 2-9
 4QIsao (4Q68): extant verse 1

Extant ancient manuscripts of a translation into Koine Greek known as the Septuagint, made in the last few centuries BCE, include Codex Vaticanus (B; B; 4th century), Codex Sinaiticus (S; BHK: S; 4th century), Codex Alexandrinus (A; A; 5th century) and Codex Marchalianus (Q; Q; 6th century).

Parashot
The parashah sections listed here are based on the Aleppo Codex. Isaiah 15 is a part of the Prophecies about the Nations (Isaiah 13–23). {P}: open parashah; {S}: closed parashah.
 {P} 15:1-9 [16:1-4 {S}]

Verse 1
The burden against Moab.
Because in the night Ar of Moab is laid waste
And destroyed,
Because in the night Kir of Moab is laid waste
And destroyed,
 "Burden": the keyword in the superscriptions for a total of nine similar oracles; the others being: Isaiah 13:1; 17:1; 19:1; 21:1, 11, 13; 22:1; 23:1.

Verse 5
My heart will cry out for Moab
Isaiah records his sympathy with Moab.

See also

Ar-Moab
Ascent of Luhith
Beer Elim

Dibon
Dimon
Eglaim
Elealeh
Heshbon
Horonaim
Jahaz
Kir-Moab
Medeba
Moab
Nebo
Nimrim
Zoar

Related Bible parts:  2 Kings 3, 2 Kings 13, Isaiah 13, Isaiah 14, Isaiah 16, Isaiah 25, Jeremiah 48, Ezekiel 25

Notes and references

Sources

External links

Jewish
Isaiah 15 Hebrew with Parallel English

Christian
Isaiah 15 English Translation with Parallel Latin Vulgate

15